Lourenço is a Portuguese surname and masculine given name of Latin origin. It is used in Portugal, Brazil, and other Portuguese-speaking countries. The name was derived from the Roman surname Laurentius, which meant "from Laurentum". Laurentum was an ancient Roman city of Latium situated between Ostia and Lavinium, on the west coast of the Italian peninsula southwest of Rome.

Notable people named Lourenço 
 Lourenço (footballer), Brazilian footballer
 Lourenço de Almeida, Portuguese explorer and military commander
 Lourenço Mutarelli, Brazilian comic book artist, writer and actor
 Lourenço Martins, Portuguese volleyball player
 Lourenço Ortigão, Portuguese actor
 João Manuel Gonçalves Lourenço, President of Angola

Portuguese given names
Portuguese masculine given names
Surnames from given names
Portuguese-language surnames